Hewavitharana Maha Vidyalaya is a mixed school in Sri Lanka, located in Rajagiriya. Hewavitharana Maha Vidyalaya has two sections: the Primary section, serving students from Grade 1 to Grade 5, and the Secondary section, serving students from Grade 6 to Grade 13.

Primary section
There are classes from grade 1 to grade 5.

External links
 
 Hewavitharana Maha Vidyalaya's SchoolNet website

Schools in Colombo District
National schools in Sri Lanka
Buddhist schools in Sri Lanka